Fox Volant of the Snowy Mountain is a 2006   Hong Kong-Chinese television series adapted from Louis Cha's novels Fox Volant of the Snowy Mountain and The Young Flying Fox. Directed by Andrew Lau and Tam Yau-yip, the series is a co-production by the Hong Kong companies ATV and TVB and Ciwen Pictures, with Wong Jing as producer, starring Nie Yuan, Athena Chu, Gillian Chung, Ady An, Alex Fong, Anthony Wong and Patrick Tam. It was first broadcast in Hong Kong on ATV in 2006.

Plot

The plot generally follows the novels but some new changes have been introduced, creating links between the original story and the Condor Trilogy, another set of novels by Louis Cha. Tian Guinong is given a greater role as the primary villain - he survives the fall after being knocked off a cliff by Hu Fei and returns as an even more powerful foe. Apparently, Tian discovered Li Zicheng's treasure in a cave at the cliff's base and found a martial arts manual detailing Zhou Botong's famous skill, the 'Technique of Ambidexterity', along with the reforged Heaven Sword and Dragon Saber. He masters the skill and uses his new weapons to face the protagonists once more. Characters from The Book and the Sword are also given greater roles in the series. The cliffhanger ending in the novel is also replaced by a happy reunion for Hu Fei and his third love interest Miao Ruolan.

Cast
 Nie Yuan as Hu Fei
 Ye Zilong as young Hu Fei
 Anthony Wong as Hu Yidao
 Athena Chu as Yuan Ziyi
 Gillian Chung as Cheng Lingsu
 Ady An as Miao Ruolan
 Lin Jing as young Miao Ruolan (4 years old)
 Zhang Yijing as young Miao Ruolan (11 years old)
 Alex Fong as Miao Renfeng
 Patrick Tam as Tian Guinong
 Lü Yi as Nan Lan
 Zhang Tong as Hu Yidao's wife
 Gao Hu as Ping A'si
 Chen Jiajia as Xue Que
 Ren Yuanyuan as Ma Chunhua
 Wu Qingzhe as Chen Jialuo / Fuk'anggan
 Wang Zhiqiang as Taoist Wuchen
 Dong Zhihua as Zhao Banshan
 Sang Weilin as Wen Tailai
 Meng Fanlong as Chang Bozhi
 Wang Yunsheng as Chang Hezhi
 Jin Peng as Xu Tianhong
 Tong Shanshan as Luo Bing
 Chen Youwang as Yuan Shixiao
 Li Guohua as Feng Tiannan
 Hai Yan as old Mrs Shang
 Liu Yanyu as Shang Baozhen
 Xia Yang as Fan Changfeng
 Wang Bin as Fan Changjiang
 Ma Weifu as Yan Ji
 Zhao Jian as Nan Rentong
 Kang Shaoying as Nan Zhique
 Ding Guanghe as Wang Jianying
 Yang Xing as Wang Jianjie
 Liu Tiexin as Tao Baisui
 Fei Weitao as Miao Fu
 Tian Yi as Lü Xiaomei
 Bo Guanjun as Ma Xingkong
 Wang Pengkai as Xu Zheng
 Kang Xueqing as Xiaoqi
 Wang Weinan as Feng Yiming
 Li Zhenqi as Li Zicheng
 Peng Xiuping as Mrs Zhong

References

External links
  Fox Volant of the Snowy Mountain official website
  Fox Volant of the Snowy Mountain official page on ATV's website

Works based on Flying Fox of Snowy Mountain
Television series set in the Qing dynasty
Hong Kong wuxia television series
2006 Hong Kong television series debuts
Asia Television original programming
Television shows based on works by Jin Yong
Television series by Ciwen Media